Suresh Kumar Pujari (born 29 July 1960) is an Indian politician. He was elected to the Lok Sabha, lower house of the Parliament of India from Bargarh, Odisha in the 2019 Indian general election as a member of the Bharatiya Janata Party. Suresh Pujari was a national secretary of the Bhartiya Janata Party and represented the state of Odisha in the central committee of the BJP, chaired by National President Amit Shah.

References

External links
 Official biographical sketch in Parliament of India website

Living people
India MPs 2019–present
Lok Sabha members from Odisha
Bharatiya Janata Party politicians from Odisha
People from Bargarh
1960 births